Richard Assheton Cross, 1st Viscount Cross,  (30 May 1823 – 8 January 1914), known before his elevation to the peerage as R. A. Cross, was a British statesman and Conservative politician. He notably served as Home Secretary between 1874 and 1880 and 1885 and 1886.

Background and education
Cross was born in Red Scar, near Preston, Lancashire, the son of William Cross (1771–1827) and his wife Ellen, daughter of Edward Chaffers. He was educated at Rugby School and Trinity College, Cambridge, and was the President of the Cambridge Union in 1845. He was called to the Bar by the Inner Temple in 1849, attaching himself to the Northern Circuit.

Political career

Cross entered Parliament as one of two representatives for Preston in 1857, a seat he held until 1862. He was out of Parliament for the next year. While out of Parliament, Cross was a partner at Parr's Bank, of which he became chairman in 1870. In 1868 he was elected for South West Lancashire, topping the poll and defeating Gladstone, and continued to represent this constituency until his elevation to the peerage in 1886.

Cross first came to prominence as Home Secretary in Disraeli's second government (1874–1880), to which post he had been appointed without first holding junior office. He remained Home Secretary in Lord Salisbury's first government (1885–1886). The latter year he was raised to the peerage as Viscount Cross, of Broughton-in-Furness in the County Palatine of Lancaster, and was moved over to the India Office (1886–1892), where he oversaw the passage of the Indian Councils Act 1892. Lord Cross was very briefly Chancellor of the Duchy of Lancaster in Salisbury's third government (1895–1902) before being elevated to the sinecure post Lord Privy Seal. In 1898 he chaired the Joint Select Committee on Electrical Energy (Generating Stations and Supply), which recommended granting compulsory purchase powers for the building of power stations. He retired in 1900.

In 1884, Cross was elected to the Board of the Manchester, Sheffield and Lincolnshire Railway, and he remained a Director of that company, and of its successor the Great Central Railway (GCR), until his death. During Board meetings, he would occasionally murmur "Where is the money to come from?" In June 1909, when he was senior Director of the GCR, that railway named one of its class 8D express passenger locomotives The Rt. Hon. Viscount Cross G.C.B., G.C.S.I. in his honour.

Family

Lord Cross married Georgiana, daughter of Thomas Lyon, in 1852. His eldest son, the Hon. William Cross, represented Liverpool West Derby in Parliament. Lady Cross died in January 1907.

Lord Cross survived her by seven years and died in January 1914, aged 90. He was succeeded in the viscountcy by his grandson, Richard Assheton Cross, the only son of the Honourable William Cross.

Arms

References

Sources
 BOPCRIS database entry on Cross Committee

External links 

 

Cross, Richard Assheton Cross, 1st Viscount
Cross, Richard Assheton Cross, 1st Viscount
Cross, Richard Assheton Cross, 1st Viscount
Cross, Richard Assheton Cross, 1st Viscount
Cross, Richard Assheton Cross, 1st Viscount
Cross, Richard Assheton Cross, 1st Viscount
Cross, Richard Assheton Cross, 1st Viscount
Cross, Richard Assheton Cross, 1st Viscount
Cross, Richard Assheton Cross, 1st Viscount
Cross, Richard Assheton Cross, 1st Viscount
Cross, Richard Assheton Cross, 1st Viscount
Conservative Party (UK) MPs for English constituencies
UK MPs 1857–1859
UK MPs 1859–1865
UK MPs 1868–1874
UK MPs 1874–1880
UK MPs 1880–1885
UK MPs 1885–1886
UK MPs 1886–1892
UK MPs who were granted peerages
Deputy Lieutenants of Lancashire
Fellows of the Royal Society
Directors of the Great Central Railway
Peers of the United Kingdom created by Queen Victoria
Hulme Trust